Sedgefield railway station served the town of Sedgefield, County Durham, England, from 1835 to 1952 on the Clarence Railway.

History 
The station was opened on 11 July 1835 by the Clarence Railway. It closed on 31 March 1952 but continued to be used for race meetings until 1960.

References 

Disused railway stations in County Durham
Railway stations in Great Britain opened in 1835
Railway stations in Great Britain closed in 1952
1835 establishments in England
1952 disestablishments in England